= Annursnac Hill =

Highest point
- Elevation: 361 ft (110 m)
- Coordinates: 42.477871°N 71.395339°W

Naming
- English translation: "Lookout place"

Geography
- Location: Concord, Massachusetts, United States

Climbing
- Easiest route: Annursnac Conservation Land

Annursnac Hill is located in Concord, Massachusetts. It is the highest point in the town at 361 ft. Early settlers herded swine near the base of the hill and referred to the area as the “hog pens.” Harvard University purchased land on the north side of the hill in 1949 for antenna research. 118 acres were bought by the Town of Concord in 1970. Part of the area was developed into private residences while a majority of the land north of the hill became conservation land.
